Nannoparce poeyi is a moth of the  family Sphingidae. It is known from Mexico, Cuba, Jamaica and the Dominican Republic.

Subspecies
Nannoparce poeyi poeyi (Cuba and the Dominican Republic) 
Nannoparce poeyi haterius (Druce, 1888) (Mexico)

References

Sphingini
Moths described in 1865